Play Up the Band is a 1935 British musical comedy film directed by Harry Hughes and starring Stanley Holloway, Betty Ann Davies and Leslie Bradley.

The film was made at Ealing Studios by the independent company City Films. The film's sets were designed by art director R. Holmes Paul. Location shooting took place at the Crystal Palace, which burnt down the following year.

Synopsis
The brass band of the Northern town of Hechdyke travel south to London to compete in a national contest. In the capital Sam Small becomes mixed up in a series of adventures including a plot to steal Lady Heckdyke's pearls and the romantic relationship between Heckdyke's son and Small's cousin Betty. Mistakenly arrested for the theft of the pearls, Small has to race to reach The Crystal Palace in time for the competition.

Cast
 Stanley Holloway as Sam Small 
 Betty Ann Davies as Betty Small 
 Leslie Bradley as Jack 
 Frank Atkinson as Alf Ramsbottom 
 Charles Sewell as Lord Hechdyke 
 Amy Veness as Lady Heckdyke 
 Cynthia Stock as Vera 
 Julie Suedo as Marquise de Vaux 
 Arthur Gomez as Marquis de Vaux
 Hal Gordon as Bandmaster 
 Louise Selkirk and her Ladies Orchestra as Themselves 
 The London Brass Band as Themselves

References

Bibliography
 Low, Rachael. Filmmaking in 1930s Britain. George Allen & Unwin, 1985.
 Perry, George. Forever Ealing. Pavilion Books, 1994.
 Sutton, David R. A Chorus of Raspberries: British Film Comedy 1929-1939. University of Exeter Press, 2000.
 Wood, Linda. British Films, 1927-1939. British Film Institute, 1986.

External links

1935 films
British musical comedy films
British black-and-white films
1935 musical comedy films
Films directed by Harry Hughes
Ealing Studios films
Films set in England
Films set in London
Films shot in London
Films scored by Eric Spear
1930s English-language films
1930s British films